Szabadhídvég is a village in Fejér county, Hungary.

History
According to László Szita the settlement was completely Hungarian in the 18th century.

References

External links 
 Street map 

Populated places in Fejér County